The Blue Bird All American is a series of buses produced by American school bus manufacturer Blue Bird Corporation (originally Blue Bird Body Company) since 1948.  Originally developed as a yellow school bus (its most common configuration), versions of the All American have been designed for a wide variety of applications, ranging from the Blue Bird Wanderlodge luxury motorhome to buses for law enforcement use.

While not the first transit-style school bus, the All American is the longest-produced model line currently in production; it is currently in its sixth generation.  Since 1952, Blue Bird has used a proprietary chassis for the All American, a practice later used for its TC/2000 and Vision buses (and their derivatives).  The model line is produced with both front-engine and rear-engine configurations.

Alongside the current generation of the All American (released in 2014), the model line underwent major redesigns in 1952, 1957, 1989, 1999, and 2008.  Over its 73 years of production, nearly all examples have been assembled by Blue Bird at its facility in Fort Valley, Georgia.  From the 1960s to the 1980s, the model line was also produced in South America, using locally sourced chassis.

Development

1930s 
In the 1930s, to expand student seating capacity in school buses, manufacturers developed "forward control" school buses.  By modifying conventional truck chassis, the engine was placed next to the driver and the front axle moved rearward of the entrance door.  This allowed for the use of greater capacity within the same overall length and better forward visibility; the shorter wheelbase gave them improved maneuverability.

In 1932, Crown Coach introduced the Supercoach alongside a similar design by Wayne Works; Gillig introduced a design with a rear-mounted engine.  In 1937, the Crown Supercoach was expanded to a capacity of 79 passengers, becoming one of the largest school buses of its time.

1940s 
In the years following World War II, Blue Bird company founder A.L. Luce sought to develop his own forward control bus.  In 1948, during a trip to Europe, he and his son George visited the Paris Auto Salon.  One of the vehicles on display was a front-engine motorcoach (either Van Hool or Jonckheere bodywork) with a General Motors chassis built in an Opel factory in Belgium.

Inspired by the design, A.L. Luce sought to develop uses for the chassis as a school bus; however, the Luces learned that it was a model specifically for export markets.  In an effort to reverse-engineer the vehicle, A.L. Luce purchased the Paris Auto coach from the body manufacturer in order to ship it to Blue Bird in Fort Valley, Georgia.  Moving past the bodywork, Blue Bird engineers found that the Opel chassis shared much in common with Chevrolet medium-duty trucks converted to forward-control; the front axle was widened and modifications were made to the steering gear.  In a unique feature, the transmission was shifted by remote control.

Due to its design commonality with the export Opel chassis, Blue Bird selected Chevrolet as the initial chassis for the forward-control prototype.  The first prototype, named Blue Bird All American, was completed in 1949.  Plagued by engineering issues, the All American did not enter full production until 1950.

Design history

First generation (1950–1956) 
For 1950 and 1951, the All American saw relatively little marketplace success; its method of assembly hindered its production.  While using a Chevrolet/GMC chassis (a version used by Blue Bird conventional models), to build the All American, Blue Bird had to strip the cowled-chassis frame bare and convert it to a forward-control layout before the body was mounted to the frame.  Along with adding time to final assembly, the conversion process required that nearly every chassis component be rechecked for functionality.

In 1952, to improve quality and reduce production time, Blue Bird ended the use of second-party chassis for the All American, developing its own design from the ground up.  Subsequently, every front-engine All American has utilized a Blue Bird chassis (rear-engine, since 1988); since 2008, all full-size Blue Bird buses use a proprietary chassis design.  In a secondary change, Blue Bird expanded the range of engines for the All American beyond Chevrolet and GMC.

In the switch to the Blue Bird chassis, several changes were made to the body of the All American.  In a change that remains a current part of the design, the front roofline was extended forward several inches (nearly in line with the front bumper).  Along with a larger entryway and entry door, the revision introduced a much larger windshield sloped nearly vertically.  The overall seating capacity of the All American was expanded, with the largest versions seating up to 72 passengers.

Second generation (1957–1989) 

For 1957, along with the Blue Bird Conventional, the body of the All American was given a ground-up redesign.  To better accommodate older students and adult passengers walking inside the bus standing up, the roof was raised upward several inches, matched with flatter sides.  The drivers' compartment was completely redesigned; to reduce blind spots, the entry door glass was enlarged and the windshield was made panoramic, nearly wrapping from the entry door to the driver window.

In 1958, after federal legislation permitted their use on road vehicles, quad headlights were added to the All American; in various forms, the All American would use quad headlights through 2013.

In 1961, Blue Bird expanded the All American product line by introducing a rear-engine "pusher" configuration.  Developed largely to secure bids in areas where rear-engine buses were favored, Blue Bird initially outsourced the chassis for the All American Rear Engine to GMC.  For 1962, to further improve forward visibility, the windshield was enlarged further, with two versions offered: a 4-pane flat glass version (standard) or a 2-pane curved glass (optional).  For 1967, the roofline of the All American underwent a slight revision.  To better accommodate the 8-lamp warning systems coming into use, the curved roof cap used since the 1930s was replaced by a flat, vertically-oriented design.  For 1968, the bodywork below the windshield was revised, including a new (larger) grille, vertically-stacked headlamps, and a reduction of the amount of chrome trim.

During the 1970s, the All American underwent several changes; centered around compliance with the introduction of safety regulations, few changes were externally visible.  To comply with regulations introduced for 1977 production, the body panels and internal structure were strengthened; as a passive restraint system, high-back padded passenger seats were added.  To match the front roof cap, Blue Bird changed the rear roof cap to a vertical design (borrowing bodywork from the Wanderlodge).

In contrast to the first All Americans, which offered a maximum of 60-passenger seating, by the end of the 1970s, an All American could be equipped to seat 90 passengers.  Alongside its rear-engine counterpart, the front-engine All American was sold with both gasoline and diesel engines.  As an effect of the 1970s fuel crises, fuel economy concerns led to widespread adoption of diesel engines in high-capacity school buses.

The All American evolutionary changes during the 1980s, centered around updates to powertrain supplier.  In 1981, Ford discontinued its Super Duty V8; the Chevrolet 427 cubic-inch V8 became the sole gasoline-powered engine offering.  Alongside the rear-engine version, the front-engine All American was produced with diesel engines supplied by Caterpillar, Cummins, and Detroit Diesel.  As a design change, in 1982, a drop-sash window was added to the rearmost row of seats, replacing a fixed pane of glass (available as an option for several years).

After using second-party chassis from multiple manufacturers since 1961, Blue Bird commenced production of a proprietary chassis for the rear-engine All American for 1988.

Design epilogue 
In production for 32 years, the second-generation All American is among the longest-produced bus bodies in North American bus manufacturing history (outclassed by Crown, Gillig, and the GM New Look/Classic).  With the exception of the All American D3-series and EC-72 prototypes, all full-size Blue Bird school buses produced since 1957 have derived much of their bodywork from the second-generation All American.  While using a lighter-duty chassis and a different design for the driver compartment, the TC/2000 school bus also derives much of its bodywork from the second-generation All American.  In various sizes, the windshield design introduced on the All American in 1962 was retained through 2013; it currently remains in use on the Vision.

Following the introduction of a rear-engine chassis for the All American in 1988, Blue Bird began a shift towards using company-produced chassis for all of its bodies; with the exception of the Micro Bird (based on a cutaway van), all Blue Bird vehicles are produced on proprietary chassis.

Third generation (1989–1998) 
Introduced during 1989 production, the third-generation All American marked the most extensive changes to the model line since 1957.  To modernize the All American for both drivers and mechanics, Blue Bird made multiple changes to the interior and the chassis of the bus.  For the first time since 1967, horizontally-aligned headlamps returned to the exterior.

To streamline its production, much of the body was carried over from the previous generation (entirely so, above the window line).  The drivers' compartment was completely redesigned, retaining only the windshield and driver-side window.  The instrument panel was angled more vertically (to better face the driver), including more legible gauges; a modernized secondary control panel was adopted from the TC/2000.

While the redesign carried over the windshield (used since 1962), multiple changes were made to upgrade driver sightlines.  Alongside the redesign of the dashboard, the entry door was redesigned with larger glass panels (a design later adopted by all Blue Bird buses).  On front-engine buses, a less-obstructive engine cover design provided more room for both the driver and the front entry steps (the design remained much larger than that of the TC/2000, as the two model lines used different engines).  To improve serviceability, the configuration of the front body panels was revised, allowing them to be removed for general maintenance without the use of tools.

In a major change, the third-generation All American introduced an entirely new powertrain range; both manual transmissions and gasoline engines were discontinued (both remaining standard for the TC/2000).  In response to the discontinuation of the Caterpillar 3208 and Detroit Diesel 8.2L V8 diesels, Cummins inline-6 diesels were introduced.

To bring it in line with the TC/2000, Blue Bird rebranded the new generation of the export name of the All American to Blue Bird TC/3000.  Previously, Canadian exports (the largest market outside the United States) were re-branded as Blue Bird All Canadians.  As with the previous generation, the 1990 All American would change little over its production run. 1990-1991 models are distinguished by widely spaced "Blue Bird" lettering below the windshield while 1992-1998 models are identified by narrowly spaced lettering.

Alternative-fuel vehicles 
In 1991, Blue Bird took part in a California Energy Commission program to develop modern, low-emissions school buses.  Following the development of prototype derived from a GMC-chassis conventional, Blue Bird supplied 10 buses using a GMC engine converted to run on compressed natural gas.  For subsequent phases of the program, the CNG buses were rear-engine All Americans, using engines supplied by John Deere.

Outside of the California school bus study, CNG school buses became an option, with Blue Bird offering an 8.1L John Deere CNG engine as an option for the rear-engine All American alongside its TC/2000 counterpart.

Fourth generation (1999–2013) 
For 1999, the fourth generation of the All American was introduced.  Internally designated the "A3" series, the fourth generation marked a major structural revision to the model line, adopting a "drop-frame" chassis; on both configurations, the portion of the frame rails that supported the drivetrain were lowered in height.  On front-engine buses, the drop-frame design further reduced the intrusion of engine cover.

Externally distinguished by its redesigned (smaller) grille and headlamp housings, the A3 series retained the body structure of the previous generation, adding the larger windshield of the TC/2000.  The front fascia was largely devoid of chrome trim (relegated to the "Blue Bird" badge between the headlamps and its surrounding imitation grille trim).  The dashboard again went a complete redesign with updated instruments and controls; the TC/2000 adopted the design for 2000 production.  The side door design was carried over, with a black-frame door becoming an option (later becoming standard).  Following the introduction of the A3 series, the Blue Bird transit-style product range would undergo an extensive transition.  Following its 1999 introduction, Blue Bird discontinued the rear-engine TC/2000, consolidating its rear-engine offerings in the All American product line.  In 2001, the company ended production of the TC/1000 front-engine minibus and discontinued the CS and APC commercial derivatives of both the TC/2000 and All American in 2002.  To consolidate its front-engine offerings, Blue Bird discontinued the TC/2000 after 2003 (following a short run of 2004 vehicles).  After 2010, Blue Bird manufactured only the Vision and the All American (with the Micro Bird manufactured by Girardin in Quebec).

At its launch, the A3 series carried over the same diesel and CNG engine offerings as the previous generation

The fourth-generation All American continued the use of Cummins and Caterpillar inline-6 diesel engines; initially, the John Deere 8.1L engine was offered for CNG use, later replaced by a 5.9L Cummins and ISL-G Cummins engines.

As Blue Bird initially intended to replace the model line entirely with the fifth-generation D3 series, the rear-engine A3 was discontinued in 2008.  Supported by continued customer demand, the front-engine A3 was produced through 2013 (outliving its successor by a year), when the sixth-generation T3 series replaced both the fourth-generation and fifth-generation All Americans.

Alongside its traditional role of a yellow school bus, the A3 series was produced for other applications; the model line was offered for sale for U.S. General Services Administration motor pool fleets, along for export worldwide.

Fifth generation (2010–2013) 

Introduced for 2010 production, the fifth-generation All American (internally designated the "D3" series) was unveiled at an industry trade show in Myrtle Beach, South Carolina on October 28, 2008. The D3 series marked the most extensive changes to the body design of the All American (and all Blue Bird buses) in over 50 years.  For the first time since 1957, the All American returned to two headlamps (round ones, for the first time since early 1989).  Completely devoid of chrome trim, the design deleted "Blue Bird" lettering from the front of the bus (replacing it with a company logo).

Continuing the use of a drop-frame chassis from the previous generation, the body received a completely new roofline and drivers' compartment design.  The shape of the roofline was squared off and raised in height (matching the previous high-headroom roof); as a part of the redesign, the entry door was raised in height.  The long-running flat-glass windshield was replaced by a two-piece curved design (extending further downward and upward); to improve sightlines, the sideview and convex mirrors were integrated into a single housing.  At the rear of the bus, the emergency door was redesigned, enlarged in height and width (for the first time since the second generation).  The drivers' compartment received a new steering column and instrument panel (both later used by the Vision), along with a new layout for driver controls (on both sides of the steering wheel).

The D3 series continued the use of diesel and CNG engines (the latter, on rear-engine vehicles).  Coinciding with the exit of Caterpillar from on-highway engine production, all engines were sourced from Cummins.  Front-engine buses were powered by the Cummins ISB 6.7, with rear-engine buses using the ISC 8.3.

In production for only four years, the D3 series is the shortest-produced version of the All American.  Intended as the successor to the A3, the D3 replaced the rear-engine A3 directly for 2009, with Blue Bird producing the front-engine version of the model line alongside its predecessor to accommodate customer demand.  Both versions of the D3 were discontinued after 2012, with the front-engine A3 ending production in 2013.

Introduced for 2014 production, the sixth-generation T3 series replaced both the fourth and fifth generation versions of the model line.

Sixth generation (2014–present) 

In October 2012, Blue Bird debuted the sixth generation of the All American for 2014 production (internally designated the T3 series).  Replacing both the fourth and fifth generations (produced concurrently), the sixth generation introduced additional structural upgrades to the body.  In a central part of the redesign, Blue Bird increased parts commonality between the All American and the Vision conventional-style bus, with the two sharing additional dashboard controls and components.

While visibly sharing lower body panels with the A3 series and the Vision, the T3 introduced a number of structural reinforcements to the body, intended for increased rollover protection; the redesign reintroduced the curved roof configuration.  While the grille was redesigned (becoming a slotted panel), the front fascia was largely retained from the D3 series, sharing its two-piece windshield and round headlamps.  In a visual change, Blue Bird ended the use of the full-length roofline "streamer" (roof stripe), replacing it with a design shared directly with Micro Bird buses (further increasing production commonality).        Since its introduction, the sixth-generation All American has been offered with both diesel and CNG engines.  A 6.7L Cummins inline-6 diesel is the standard engine for both front-engine and rear-engine versions; both diesel and CNG versions of the Cummins ISL (Cummins L9 since 2018) are options for the rear-engine T3.

In 2019, Blue Bird introduced a battery-electric version of the All American, which uses the rear-engine chassis.

Export markets

Throughout much of its production, the All American has been exported by Blue Bird to markets worldwide as both a school bus and for other applications.  Following the expansion of Blue Bird into Canada in 1958, the All American adopted the Blue Bird All Canadian brand name.  Following the 1988 introduction of the TC/2000, the All Canadian was renamed the Blue Bird TC/3000, using the same name in all export markets.  Export versions of the D3 and T3 generations are branded as the TX3 and TX4, respectively.

Following the 1966 establishment of its manufacturing facility located in Guatemala (Blue Bird Central America), the factory produced buses using the All American body.  In a shift from its American-produced counterpart, Blue Bird Central America used locally sourced truck chassis (Ford, Mercedes-Benz, and Hino), instead of the proprietary Blue Bird chassis.  Alongside school buses, many examples were built for mass transit.  Blue Bird Central America was closed by the company in the early 1980s.

Central American Countries like El Salvador & Honduras, have been known to use Bluebird, Thomas, and IC School Buses and convert them to Transit Buses, Usually the older ones.

Variants

Commercial use (APC/CS)
Alongside buses produced for multiple applications, Blue Bird produced two distinct model commercial-use model ranges of the All American during the 1990s.  The Blue Bird APC (All Purpose Coach) was directly derived from the body of the school bus, typically fitted with transit bus seating.  The heaviest-duty model (the APC 3000) was derived from the All American.

Again sharing its chassis underpinnings with the TC/2000 and All American, the Blue Bird CS (Commercial Series) is a commercial transit bus that was produced during the 1990s; the heaviest-duty CS 3000 was derived from the All American.   The CS was fitted with its own roofline, including transit passenger windows, a wheelchair lift, and a destination sign.

After 2002, the APC and CS were withdrawn, with all commercial-use buses (such as law-enforcement vehicles) directly derived from the All American A3-series.  Subsequently, Blue Bird did not design transit bus variants of the D3 and T3 generations.

Recreational vehicle (Wanderlodge)

From 1963 to 1989, the Blue Bird Wanderlodge luxury motorhome was derived from body and chassis of the second-generation All American.  Initially developed as a front-engine vehicle, Blue Bird introduced rear-engine versions in 1982 (the first tandem-axle Blue Bird).  During the 1980s, the design of the two model lines began to diverge, with Blue Bird ending use of the All American chassis for 1990 production, as the Wanderlodge adopted a 102-inch body width (not then legal for school buses).

In 2007, Blue Bird sold the rights to the Wanderlodge model line, with production ending in 2009.

See also 

 Blue Bird Wanderlodge - luxury motorhome derived from the second-generation All American
 Blue Bird TC/2000 - 1988-2004 Blue Bird Type D product line.
 List of buses

References 

School buses
All American
Vehicles introduced in 1948
School bus chassis